Silicon Forest, sometimes referred to as The Silicon Forest, is an outdoor 2003 sculpture by Brian Borrello, installed near the Interstate/Rose Quarter station in Portland, Oregon's Lloyd District, in the United States.

Description and reception
Brian Borrello's Silicon Forest (2003) is an abstract sculpture made of stainless steel and light-emitting diode (LED) lights, installed at the Interstate/Rose Quarter MAX Station in Portland's Lloyd District. It depicts a series of trees with thin trunks and cone-shaped foliage. The piece has been called a "three-part metaphor for displacement and change". The solar artwork's steel trees illuminate using electricity powered by solar panels.

In 2013, Solar Power World Frank Andorka ranked the sculpture third in his list of "11 Must-See Art Installations, Inspired by Solar Panels".

See also

 2003 in art
 LED art
 Light art

References

External links
 

2003 establishments in Oregon
2003 sculptures
Abstract sculptures in Oregon
Light art
Lloyd District, Portland, Oregon
North Portland, Oregon
Outdoor sculptures in Portland, Oregon
Sculptures on the MAX Yellow Line
Stainless steel sculptures in Oregon